The Pale Blue Eye is a 2022 American mystery thriller film written and directed by Scott Cooper, adapted from the 2003 novel of the same name by Louis Bayard. The film features an ensemble cast that includes Christian Bale, Harry Melling, Gillian Anderson, Lucy Boynton, Charlotte Gainsbourg, Toby Jones, Harry Lawtey, Simon McBurney, Timothy Spall, and Robert Duvall. Its plot follows veteran detective Augustus Landor in 1830 West Point, New York, as he investigates a series of murders at the United States Military Academy with the aid of Edgar Allan Poe, a young military cadet.

The Pale Blue Eye was released in select cinemas on December 23, 2022, before its streaming release on January 6, 2023 by Netflix. The film received mixed reviews.

Plot
In October 1830, alcoholic retired detective Augustus Landor is asked by the military to investigate the hanging of Cadet Leroy Fry at the United States Military Academy at West Point, New York. Landor is a widower who lives alone since his daughter Mattie ran off a few years previously.

After Fry was hanged, his heart was removed from his body. In the morgue, examining the corpse, Landor finds a small fragment of a note clutched tightly in Fry's hand. Also, marks on Fry's neck and fingers suggest that he did not hang himself, but was murdered.

Landor secretly enlists the help of Edgar Allan Poe, another cadet at the academy, who has expressed an interest in the case. Poe and Landor deduce from the writing on the note fragment that it was summoning Fry to a secret meeting. After a cow and a sheep are found in the area, butchered and with their hearts removed, it is deduced that the murder could be linked to black magic rituals.

Another cadet, Ballinger, goes missing and is later found hanged, with both his heart and his genitals removed. A third cadet, Stoddard, who was a colleague of the two victims, then disappears, and it is presumed by Landor that this man had reason to believe he was next in line to be killed.

Landor and Poe begin to suspect the family of Dr. Daniel Marquis, who was first brought into the investigation to perform the autopsy on Fry. Particular suspicion is placed on his son Artemus and his daughter Lea (who suffers from random seizures). While visiting Dr. Marquis's house, Landor finds an old officer's uniform; a man impersonating an officer had been involved in the mutilation of Fry's body. Landor confronts Dr. Marquis, who admits that he had resorted to black magic to cure Lea of her seizures, and initially she appeared to improve.

Poe is enchanted by Lea and volunteers to do whatever she wants. However, he is drugged and wakes to find that Artemus and Lea are about to cut out his heart, in accordance with the ritual to cure Lea. Landor manages to arrive in time to rescue Poe, but the building catches fire and Lea and Artemus die.

Thinking that the case is now solved, the military thanks Landor for his service. However, after recovering from his near-death experience, Poe confronts Landor with his realization that the handwriting on the note fragment found in Fry's hand matches that of Landor. Threading together all the information that he has gathered, it becomes apparent that Landor was in fact the killer of the cadets. 

Two years previously, Landor's daughter Mattie was raped by Fry, Ballinger, and Stoddard after attending her first ball. Traumatized by the experience, she later killed herself by jumping off a cliff. Landor did not disclose this to anyone, but pretended that she had run away.

Distraught, Landor set out to avenge his daughter. He left the note for Fry, luring him to a lonely spot before hanging him. However, a patrol happened to walk by, so Landor was forced to leave the body there. Lea and Artemus later stole the heart for their ritual. After killing Ballinger, Landor mutilated his corpse to make it appear that the cadet had been murdered by the same "madman" who had desecrated Fry's body. 

Poe tells Landor he has two notes with handwriting samples that can link Landor directly to the murders, but before leaving, Poe burns them. Landor is later seen standing at the cliff where his daughter leapt to her death. He lets her hair ribbon float away in the wind, saying "Rest, my love".

Cast

In addition, John Fetterman, then Lieutenant Governor of Pennsylvania, and his wife, Gisele, appear as a couple in an uncredited cameo.

Production
In February 2021, it was announced that Christian Bale would star in the thriller film The Pale Blue Eye, written and directed by Scott Cooper, based on Louis Bayard's novel of the same name, and produced by Cross Creek Pictures. It was to be Bale and Cooper's third film together, after Out of the Furnace and Hostiles. Bale and Cooper were also set to produce with John Lesher and Tyler Thompson.

In June 2021, it was reported that Harry Melling would co-star as Edgar Allan Poe.

Filming began on November 29, 2021 at the historic Compass Inn in Laughlintown, Pennsylvania. In December, filming took place at Westminster College in New Wilmington, Pennsylvania. That month, additional cast members were announced, including Gillian Anderson, Lucy Boynton, Timothy Spall, Fred Hechinger, and Robert Duvall.

Sitting US Senator John Fetterman and his wife Gisele Barreto Fetterman are extras in a scene in the film. They became friendly with Bale and Cooper in 2013 while they were filming Out of the Furnace in Braddock, Pennsylvania, where Fetterman was mayor at the time. Bale stated, "John's got this fantastic face, hulking figure... So I said to Scott, 'We've got to have him in the tavern... That's a face that fits in the 1830s.'"

Release
The Pale Blue Eye was released in select cinemas on December 23, 2022, before its streaming release on January 6, 2023, by Netflix.

Reception 
 

Matthew Monagle of The Austin Chronicle wrote, "The Pale Blue Eye holds together remarkably as a gothic piece of horror... right up to the point that it doesn't," and that it "seems to lose its nerve in its final minutes, when Cooper's script reverts to a procedural story and reshuffles our relationships to both main characters, relying too heavily on red herrings – and ugly tropes of sexual violence – to bring the narrative home. Indeed, the entire film damn near falls apart."

James Verniere of the Boston Herald called it an "over-acted, badly written, murder mystery dud." Peter Travers of ABC News wrote: "Even when the murderer kills again and characters start daubing their faces with blood and howling at the moon or whatever's handy, the film keeps circling its convoluted plot without finding a satisfying place to land."

Accolades
The film was nominated for Outstanding Supporting Visual Effects in a Photoreal Feature at the 21st Visual Effects Society Awards.

See also

 Edgar Allan Poe bibliography
 Edgar Allan Poe in popular culture
 The Raven

References

External links
 
 
 
 

2022 films
2022 thriller drama films
2020s American films
2020s English-language films
2020s historical drama films
2020s historical thriller films
2020s mystery drama films
2020s mystery thriller films
2020s serial killer films
American detective films
American films about revenge
American historical drama films
American historical thriller films
American mystery drama films
American mystery thriller films
American serial killer films
American thriller drama films
Cross Creek Pictures films
Cultural depictions of Edgar Allan Poe
English-language Netflix original films
Films based on American novels
Films based on mystery novels
Films directed by Scott Cooper
Films scored by Howard Shore
Films set in 1830
Films set in the United States Military Academy
Films shot in Pennsylvania